James Peacock (1871 – after 1896) was an English footballer who played in the Football League for Stoke.

Career
Peacock was born in Stoke-upon-Trent and played for Dresden United before joining Stoke in 1896. He played one match in the Football League which came in a 2–1 victory over Wolverhampton Wanderers during the 1896–97 season. He was released soon after and joined Saltgates.

Career statistics

References

1871 births
Year of death missing
Footballers from Stoke-on-Trent
English footballers
Association football midfielders
Dresden United F.C. players
Stoke City F.C. players
English Football League players